The 2016 United States presidential election in Missouri was held on Tuesday, November 8, 2016, as part of the 2016 United States presidential election in which all 50 states plus the District of Columbia participated. Missouri voters chose electors to represent them in the Electoral College via a popular vote, pitting the Republican Party's nominee, businessman Donald Trump, and running mate Indiana Governor Mike Pence against Democratic Party nominee, former Secretary of State Hillary Clinton, and her running mate Virginia Senator Tim Kaine. Missouri has 10 electoral votes in the Electoral College.

Trump carried the state with 56.4% of the vote, while Clinton received 37.9%. Trump's 18.5-point margin of victory in the state was almost double that of Mitt Romney's from 2012. Clinton carried only four jurisdictions: Boone County, home to Columbia and the University of Missouri; Jackson County, which includes most of Kansas City; St. Louis County; and St. Louis City. Clinton's vote share percentage was the lowest a Democratic presidential nominee obtained in the state since George McGovern's 37.7% in 1972, further cementing the state's drift towards the Republican Party and away from its long-held status as a bellwether state. Missouri was also one of eleven states that voted for Bill Clinton in 1992 and 1996 but were lost by Hillary Clinton in 2016. Additionally, this was the first time since 1984 that Missouri voted by double digits for the Republican candidate, and the first time since 1992 that the state voted by double digits for either candidate. As of 2020, this is the largest loss by a Democrat since Democratic nominee Walter Mondale in 1984.

Primary elections

Democratic primary

Nine candidates appeared on the Democratic presidential primary ballot:
 Hillary Clinton
 Henry Hewes 
 Rocky De La Fuente
 Bernie Sanders
 Keith Judd
 Willie L. Wilson
 Martin O'Malley (withdrawn)
 John Wolfe Jr.
 Jon Adams

Republican primary

Twelve candidates appeared on the Republican presidential primary ballot:
 Jeb Bush (withdrawn)
 Ben Carson (withdrawn)
 Chris Christie (withdrawn)
 Ted Cruz
 Carly Fiorina (withdrawn)
 Mike Huckabee (withdrawn)
 John Kasich
 Rand Paul (withdrawn)
 Marco Rubio (withdrawn)
 Rick Santorum (withdrawn)
 Donald Trump

Libertarian primary
The Missouri primary ran on March 15, 2016, alongside those of the Republican, Democratic, and Constitution parties. 40% of the electorate voted to stand uncommitted to any candidate. Austin Petersen, running in his home state, finished second, with 29% of the statewide vote, which was double that of Steve Kerbel from Colorado, who finished third, with 14%. Petersen comfortably won the support of voters in the state's capital, Jefferson City, and its surrounding counties, but was fell heavily behind the uncommitted vote in the state's two largest cities, Kansas City and St. Louis. Kerbel won three counties around Springfield, while Marc Allan Feldman, Cecil Ince, and Rhett Smith all won a sprawl of counties across the state; in most of these counties, however, only a single vote was cast. No votes were cast for Libertarian Party candidates in the northwestern counties of Harrison, Holt, Mercer, and Worth.

General election

Polling

Republican Donald Trump won every pre-election poll conducted here except one. Trump won most polls by high single digits or low double digits. The average of the last three polls had Donald Trump leading Democrat Hillary Clinton 50% to 39%.

Predictions
The following are final 2016 predictions from various organizations for Missouri as of Election Day.

Results
The statewide election results were as follows. The total vote count was 2,828,266.

By county

By congressional district
Trump won 6 of 8 congressional districts.

See also
 United States presidential elections in Missouri
 2016 Democratic Party presidential debates and forums
 2016 Democratic Party presidential primaries
 2016 Republican Party presidential debates and forums
 2016 Republican Party presidential primaries
 2016 Libertarian Party presidential primaries

References

External links
 RNC 2016 Republican Nominating Process 
 Green papers for 2016 primaries, caucuses, and conventions
 Decision Desk Headquarter Results for Missouri

Missouri
2016
Presidential